Montserrat Carulla i Ventura (19 September 1930 – 24 November 2020) was a Spanish actress.

Career
Coming from the amateur theatre, she completed her training with courses at the Institut del Teatre de Barcelona (Barcelona Theatre Institute) at the end of the 1940s. However, it was not until 1960 that she began to work in the professional theatre with Soparem a casa (We'll Dine at Home), by Josep Maria de Sagarra. After two seasons in Madrid, she returned to Barcelona in 1964.

Theatre
 Soparem a casa (We'll Dine at Home), by Josep Maria de Sagarra
 El fiscal Recasens (Recasens, the District Attorney) by Josep Maria de Sagarra
 Romeo and Juliet adaptation by Josep Maria de Sagarra
 L'enterrament és a les quatre (The Burial is at Four), by Joan Vila Casas
 Mort de Dama (Death of a Lady), by Llorenç Villalonga
 La filla del mar (Daughter of the Sea), by Àngel Guimerà
 Pygmalion by Bernard Shaw
 La viuda trapella (The Widow Swindler), by Carlo Goldoni, in an adaptation by Maria Aurèlia Campmany
 Hamlet (1980),  directed by Pere Planella.
 Primera història d'Esther (First Story of Esther) (1982) by Salvador Espriu
 El temps i els Conway (1992) by J. B. Priestley
 Guys and Dolls (1998), directed by Mario Gas
 The Beauty Queen of Leenane (1999) by Martin McDonagh
 A Little Night Music (2001) by Stephen Sondheim
 La plaça del Diamant (2004)
 Almenys no és Nadal (2004)

Cinema
 Orson west (2012)
 Urteberri on, amona! (2011)
 El orfanato (2007)
 Working class (2005)
 Mala Uva (2004)
 La ciutat dels prodigis (1999)
 Carreteras secundarias (1997)
 El vicari d'Olot (1982) by Ventura Pons
 Companys, procés a Catalunya (1979) by Josep Maria Forn
 Cambio de sexo (1977) by Vicente Aranda
 Surcos (1951)

Television
 Elles et Moi (2009)
 Serrallonga (2008)
 El cor de la ciutat (2000) by Josep Maria Benet i Jornet
 Laberint d'ombres (1998), by Josep Maria Benet i Jornet
 Dones d'aigua (1997)
 Oh! Espanya (1996), by Dagoll Dagom
 Secrets de família (1995)
 Oh! Europa (1994), by Dagoll Dagom

References

External links
Catalan Hyperenciclopedia

1930 births
2020 deaths
Film actresses from Catalonia
Stage actresses from Catalonia
Television actresses from Catalonia